Md. Nazrul Islam, better known as Asif Nazrul, is a Bangladeshi writer, novelist, columnist, political commentator, and a professor of law at the University of Dhaka. Renowned for his bold critique of Bangladeshi politics, Nazrul wrote more than ten novels and nonfiction books.

Education 
Asif Nazrul completed LLB and LLM in law at the University of Dhaka respectively in 1986 and 1987, and garnered his PhD degree from the University of London in 1999. Afterwards he did his post-doctoral at the Environmental Law Center in Germany.

Career 
Nazrul is a professor of law at the University of Dhaka. Previously he worked as a journalist and an administrative officer of Bangladesh government.

Threats and legal issues 
Nazrul was called upon by High Court of Bangladesh in 2012 for giving inciting speech at a TV talk show on 12 March 2012. In 2013, his office at the University of Dhaka was set ablaze with kerosene. In May 2013, he was threatened to death in a phone call supposedly for his harsh critique of the government. In 2017, he was accused of defaming Shajahan Khan at Madaripur District Court by Faruk Khan, Shajahan Khan's cousin.

Personal life 
Nazrul is married to Shila Ahmed. Previously he was married to Rokeya Prachy.

Selected bibliography

Nonfictions 

1/11 Sushan Bitarka (1/11 Good Governance Debate)
Awami Leaguer Shasankal (Ruling years of Awami League)

Fictions 

 Nishiddha Kayekjan (Forbidden Few)
Campuser Jubak (Youth at the Campus)
Akrosh (Wrath)
Pap (Sin)
Udhao (Lost)
Anya Alor Din (Days of other light)
Dakhal (Control)
Anyapaksha (The Other Side)
Tader Ekti Rat (One Night of Theirs)
Chonya (Touch)
Asamptir Galpa (Tale of Incompletion) 
Bekar Diner Prem (Love at the Time of Unemployment)

References 

1966 births
University of Dhaka alumni
Academic staff of the University of Dhaka
Living people
21st-century Bangladeshi writers
20th-century Bangladeshi writers